Rosewood is a village community and locality in the south east part of the Riverina, New South Wales, Australia. The village is administered by two local governments; the northern part of the locality by the Greater Hume Shire and the southern part of the locality by the Snowy Valleys Council. The village of Rosewood is within the Snowy Valleys Council area.

History 
Rosewood Post Office opened on 1 August 1885.

Heritage listings
Rosewood has a number of heritage-listed sites, including:

Coppabella Blacksmith Shop

Climate 

Maxima are especially cool in winter.

Tumbarumba to Rosewood Rail Trail 
Rosewood is currently at the furthest extent of a 21 km long rail trail from Tumbarumba, which reuses a portion of the route of the former Tumbarumba railway line. It opened on 3 April 2020. The remainder of the old railway, between Rosewood and Wagga Wagga, has not been used since in 1987, but largely remains in place, in a degraded state, although some sections of track have been removed. The rail trail has been described as a 'pilot', indicating that a future extension, beyond Rosewood, is possible.

References

External links

Towns in the Riverina
Towns in New South Wales
Snowy Valleys Council
Greater Hume Shire